This list covers all faults and fault-systems that are either geologically important or connected to prominent seismic activity. It is not intended to list every notable fault, but only major fault zones.

See also
 Lists of earthquakes
 Tectonics

References

Structural geology
Seismic zones
Tectonics
Fault lines
Fault zones